Alexander Gordon Cummins Harvey (31 December 1858 – 6 November 1922) was a British cotton manufacturer and merchant and Liberal politician.

Career
Gordon Harvey (as he was usually known) was born in Manchester the son of Cummins Harvey who was a partner in the cotton yarn and cloth manufacturing firm of Fothergill and Harvey. Gordon Harvey himself went on to become the head of an important firm of cotton spinners, manufacturers and merchants with mills at Littleborough and with warehouses and offices in Manchester.

Politics

Lancashire County Council
A Liberal in politics, and sometime Chairman of Middleton Division Liberal Association, Harvey was elected to Lancashire County Council in the year after its creation and was later made an Alderman of the county. He remained chairman of the county education committee up until the time of his death.  He also served as a Justice of the Peace in Lancashire.

Parliament
Harvey first stood for Parliament at the Khaki election of 1900 as Liberal candidate for Rochdale. The election was fought in the jingoistic atmosphere of the Second Boer War which favoured the Conservatives. Despite taking the anti-war side Harvey still managed to come within 19 votes of beating the sitting Conservative MP, Clement Royds.  

Harvey was elected as MP for Rochdale, however, at the 1906 general election beating Royds, who had held the seat since 1895, by 1,463 votes. 

He held the seat at the general elections of January 

and December 1910.

He was on the extreme pacifist wing of the party and led the opposition to increased naval spending as World War One approached. The economist Francis Hirst wrote an approving biography of him.

Harvey was interested in the environment and in being a benevolent employer and some of his public works still survive in Littleborough.

Death
Harvey was obliged to stand down from Parliament at the 1918 general election because of a disease of the throat, presumably cancer. He had to undergo two operations as a result  but died at Windermere from the illness aged 63 years.

His family remained active in Liberal politics, his nephew Charles standing unsuccessfully for Rochdale in 1945 and another nephew Alexander sponsoring the young Cyril Smith to become a Liberal agent.

References

External links 
 

1858 births
1922 deaths
UK MPs 1906–1910
UK MPs 1910
UK MPs 1910–1918
Liberal Party (UK) MPs for English constituencies
Members of Lancashire County Council
Politicians from Manchester
Members of the Parliament of the United Kingdom for Rochdale